Benacus is a genus of giant water bug in the hemipteran family Belostomatidae. Benacus is a monotypic genus, containing a single species, B. griseus, which is found in North America. Benacus was formerly considered a subgenus of Lethocerus.

References

Nepomorpha genera
Belostomatidae
Hemiptera of North America
Taxa named by Carl Stål